Vieworks Co., Ltd. is a manufacturer of X-ray medical imaging devices and high-resolution machine vision cameras, located in Anyang, Republic of Korea. It designs, develops, manufactures and provides advanced X-ray detectors to digital imaging systems for digital radiography, digital fluoroscopy and angiography systems, industrial cameras for aerial imaging, and surveillance and AOI (automated optical inspection).

History 
Vieworks has developed medical and industrial imaging solutions since its establishment in 1999.
It was listed on KOSDAQ (Korean Securities Dealers Automated Quotations) in 2009.

Products

X-ray detector
Vieworks manufactures flat panel X-ray detectors for digital radiography and fluoroscopy.

Industrial Camera
Vieworks supplies machine vision cameras for flat panel display inspection, printed circuit board inspection, web inspection, aerial imaging, microscopy, document or film scanning, and scientific research.

External links 
 

Health care companies of South Korea